Felgate is a last name.

It is shared by the following people:
Alice Felgate, actress who played Amber Dean, a character on Some Girls, a British TV series
Christopher Felgate (born 1982), Zimbabwean Olympic triathlete
Cynthia Felgate (1935–1991), British television producer
David Felgate, several people
Michael Felgate (born 1981), English association football player